Karen Corr (born 10 November 1969) is a Northern Irish professional pool and former snooker and English billiards player. She was inducted in the BCA Hall of Fame in 2012.

Early life
Corr was born on 10 November 1969 in Ballymoney, Northern Ireland and spent her early childhood near Maghera. When she was 8 years old, her family moved to England.  She loved watching snooker matches on television and joined a snooker club at the age of 14 with her dad and her brother. Her friends in Bourne saw that she had exceptional snooker skills and encouraged her to play in tournaments.

Snooker and pool career
At the age of 15, she entered into her first tournament in Leicester and never looked back. Bolstered with confidence, she continued to play in tournaments and rapidly became a top–notch snooker player supported by her family. On the day after her 21st birthday, Corr won her first Women's World Snooker Championship. She would go on to repeat that feat in 1995 and 1997. She also won the World Women's Billiards Championship in 1998 and 1999.

A recession in the mid 1990s and increased restrictions on tobacco sponsorship caused prize funds to rapidly decrease for snooker events outside the World Championship. This forced Corr to look elsewhere for profitable tournament play. Fellow snooker player Julie Kelly told her about the WPBA Tour in the United States. Corr moved to America in 1998 to see how well she could play pool. After winning ten consecutive qualifying events, she was able to compete in the professional WPBA events.

By the end of 1998, Corr was ranked #24. At the end of 1999, she was ranked # 4. By the end of 2000, she was ranked 2nd in the world.

Corr won her first WPBA Classic Tour title, "The 2000 Cuetec Cues Players Championship" in Valley Forge, Pennsylvania. She completed that year with two more Classic tour titles. She also won the "All Japan Championship" held in Osaka, Japan. She placed second in the "WPA Women's World Championship" and in the "UCC World Ladies Championship" held in Tokyo, Japan.

In 2001, she became the first person to win every WPBA Classic tour event in the same season since they began. She won the silver medal at the World Games and placed 2nd at the World Championships. Before 2001 ended, Corr found herself at the top, the No. 1 ranked player in the World and remained there for 2 years.

Since then, she has been a leading player in women's pool. The crowning achievement of her career came on 26 October 2012, when Corr was formally inducted into the Greatest Player wing of the BCA Hall of Fame. Her Hall of Fame induction announcement stated "her quick rise to the top and her consistent dominance on American soil has earned her the only spot in this year's BCA Hall of Fame class."

She has been runner-up at the World 9-ball Championship four times.

Titles and achievements

Pool

 2001 Billiards Digest Player of the Year  
 2012 Billiard Congress of America Hall of Fame

Snooker

English billiards

References

External links
Karen Corr's Official website
Karen Corr on Xtreme Pressbox
Karen Corr image gallery
BCA website - Hall of Fame section

Pool players from Northern Ireland
Snooker players from Northern Ireland
Players of English billiards from Northern Ireland
1969 births
Living people
Female players of English billiards
Female pool players
Female snooker players
People from Ballymoney
World Games silver medalists
Competitors at the 2001 World Games
World champions in English billiards